A partial solar eclipse occurred on August 31, 1913. A solar eclipse occurs when the Moon passes between Earth and the Sun, thereby totally or partly obscuring the image of the Sun for a viewer on Earth. A partial solar eclipse occurs in the polar regions of the Earth when the center of the Moon's shadow misses the Earth.

Related eclipses

Solar eclipses of 1913–1917

Metonic series

References

External links 

1913 8 31
1913 in science
1913 8 31
August 1913 events